The  2017 U.S. Open Championship was the 117th U.S. Open, held June 15–18 at Erin Hills in Erin, Wisconsin, northwest of Milwaukee. Brooks Koepka claimed his first major title with a 16-under-par 272, four strokes ahead of runners-up Brian Harman and Hideki Matsuyama. Koepka's score matched the lowest ever at the championship, set in 2011 by Rory McIlroy.

This was the first U.S. Open in Wisconsin, but marked its fifth major, following four editions of the PGA Championship. It was played in 1933 at Blue Mound in Wauwatosa, and at Whistling Straits near Kohler in 2004, 2010, and 2015.

The purse was a record for a major at $12 million, and the winner's share exceeded $2 million for the first time, at $2.16 million.

Venue
This was the first U.S. Open at Erin Hills, which opened in 2006 and hosted the U.S. Amateur in 2011. It was also the first U.S. Open since 1992 at par 72.

It continued a long tradition of golf in the state, which hosted the U.S. Women's Open twice at Blackwolf Run in Kohler  and the U.S. Senior Open at Whistling Straits in 2007. The PGA Tour formerly stopped in the state regularly with the Greater Milwaukee Open  preceded by the Milwaukee Open Invitational

Course layout

2017 yardages by round

 Scoring average: 73.204
 by round: 73.385, 73.225, 72.016, 73.928
 Most difficult holes in relation to par: 3, 4, 6, 17

Field
About half the field consisted of players who were exempt from qualifying for the U.S. Open. Each player is classified according to the first category in which he qualified, and other categories are shown in parentheses.

1. Winners of the U.S. Open Championship during the last ten years
Ángel Cabrera, Lucas Glover, Dustin Johnson (12,13,14,15), Martin Kaymer (14,15), Graeme McDowell, Rory McIlroy (6,7,13,14,15), Justin Rose (11,14,15), Webb Simpson, Jordan Spieth (5,13,14,15)
 Tiger Woods did not play.

2. Winner and runner-up of the 2016 U.S. Amateur Championship
Brad Dalke (a)
 Curtis Luck forfeited his exemption by turning professional in April 2017.

3. Winner of the 2016 Amateur Championship
Scott Gregory (a)

4. Winner of the 2016 Mark H. McCormack Medal (men's World Amateur Golf Ranking)
Maverick McNealy (a)

5. Winners of the Masters Tournament during the last five years
Sergio García (12,14,15), Adam Scott (13,14,15), Bubba Watson (13,14,15), Danny Willett (14,15)

6. Winners of The Open Championship during the last five years
Ernie Els, Zach Johnson (12), Henrik Stenson (14,15)
 Phil Mickelson (13,14,15) withdrew to attend his daughter's high school graduation.

7. Winners of the PGA Championship during the last five years
Jason Day (8,12,13,14,15), Jason Dufner (12,13,15), Jimmy Walker (13,14,15)

8. Winners of The Players Championship during the last three years
Rickie Fowler (14,15), Kim Si-woo (13,14,15)

9. Winner of the 2017 European Tour BMW PGA Championship
Alex Norén (14,15)

10. Winner of the 2016 U.S. Senior Open Championship
Gene Sauers

11. Winner of the 2016 Olympic Golf Tournament

12. The 10 lowest scorers and anyone tying for 10th place at the 2016 U.S. Open Championship
Jim Furyk, Branden Grace (14,15), Shane Lowry, Kevin Na (13), Scott Piercy (14), Daniel Summerhays

13. Players who qualified for the season-ending 2016 Tour Championship
Daniel Berger (14,15), Paul Casey (14,15), Roberto Castro, Kevin Chappell (14,15), Emiliano Grillo (14,15), J. B. Holmes (14,15), Kevin Kisner (14,15), Russell Knox (14,15), Matt Kuchar (14,15), Hideki Matsuyama (14,15), William McGirt (14,15), Sean O'Hair, Patrick Reed (14,15), Charl Schwartzel (14,15), Brandt Snedeker (14,15), Justin Thomas (14,15), Jhonattan Vegas, Gary Woodland (14,15)
 Ryan Moore (14,15) withdrew due to a shoulder injury.

14. The top 60 point leaders and ties as of May 22, 2017 in the Official World Golf Ranking
An Byeong-hun (15), Wesley Bryan (15), Rafa Cabrera-Bello (15), Ross Fisher (15), Matt Fitzpatrick (15), Tommy Fleetwood (15), Bill Haas (15), Adam Hadwin (15), Brian Harman (15), Tyrrell Hatton (15), Russell Henley (15), Charley Hoffman (15), Billy Horschel (15), Yuta Ikeda (15), Brooks Koepka (15), Marc Leishman (15), Francesco Molinari (15), Louis Oosthuizen (15), Pat Perez (15), Thomas Pieters (15), Jon Rahm (15), Brendan Steele (15), Hideto Tanihara (15), Wang Jeung-hun, Lee Westwood (15), Bernd Wiesberger (15)

15. The top 60 point leaders and ties as of June 12, 2017 in the Official World Golf Ranking
Chris Wood

16. Special exemptions given by the USGA
None

The remaining contestants earned their places through sectional qualifiers.
Japan: Shugo Imahira, Chan Kim (L), Satoshi Kodaira, Yūsaku Miyazato
England: Thomas Aiken, Oliver Bekker, George Coetzee, Bradley Dredge, Paul Dunne, Andrew Johnston, Alexander Lévy, Li Haotong, Wade Ormsby, Eddie Pepperell, Aaron Rai, Richie Ramsay, Joël Stalter, Brandon Stone, Matt Wallace
United States
Newport Beach, California: Mason Andersen (a,L), Cameron Champ (a,L), Kevin Dougherty (L), Stewart Hagestad (a), John Oda (a), Sahith Theegala (a)
Tequesta, Florida: Tyson Alexander (L), Jack Maguire (L), Joaquín Niemann (a)
Ball Ground, Georgia: Stephan Jäger, Alex Smalley (a,L)
Rockville, Maryland: Ben Kohles, Sam Ryder, Kyle Thompson
Summit, New Jersey: Matt Campbell (L), Daniel Chopra, Chris Crawford (a,L), Scott Harvey (a), Andy Pope (L)
Columbus, Ohio: Keegan Bradley, Bud Cauley, Stewart Cink, Bryson DeChambeau, Talor Gooch, Jason Kokrak, Martin Laird, David Lingmerth, Jamie Lovemark, Pan Cheng-tsung, J. T. Poston, Ted Potter Jr., Scottie Scheffler (a), Peter Uihlein
Springfield, Ohio: Ryan Brehm, Corey Conners (L), Brice Garnett, Brian Stuard
Memphis, Tennessee: Harris English, Troy Merritt, Trey Mullinax, Garrett Osborn (L), Jonathan Randolph, Chez Reavie, Andrés Romero, Xander Schauffele, Steve Stricker
Dallas, Texas: Nick Flanagan (L), Walker Lee (a,L), Roman Robledo (L)
Lakewood, Washington: Derek Barron (L), Max Greyserman (L), Daniel Miernicki (L), Jordan Niebrugge (L)

Alternates who gained entry:
 Michael Putnam (Columbus) – replaced Ryan Moore
 Grégory Bourdy (England) – claimed spot held for category 15
 Kim Meen-whee (Memphis) – claimed spot held for category 15
 Tyler Light (L, Springfield) – claimed spot held for category 15
 Dru Love (L, Ball Ground) – claimed spot held for category 15
 Ryan Palmer (Dallas) – claimed spot held for category 15
 Roberto Díaz (Summit) – replaced Phil Mickelson

(a) denotes amateur
(L) denotes player advanced through local qualifying

Nationalities in the field

Round summaries

First round
Thursday, June 15, 2017

Rickie Fowler tied the U.S. Open record for lowest first round score in relation to par, shooting a bogey-free round of 65 (−7) for a one-shot lead over Paul Casey and Xander Schauffele. The course played easily, yielding 44 under-par rounds. Despite this, many of the pre-tournament favorites faltered. Jordan Spieth played solidly, but stumbled late for an opening 73 (+1). World number one Dustin Johnson was derailed by a double bogey on the par-5 14th, shooting a 3-over 75. Jon Rahm, Rory McIlroy, and Jason Day were even worse, shooting 76 (+4), 78 (+6), and 79 (+7), respectively. Meanwhile, Canadian Adam Hadwin tied a U.S. Open record with six straight birdies, en route to shooting four under par. This was the first major in which neither Phil Mickelson or Tiger Woods competed, in 23 years. The scoring average was 73.385 (+1.385).

Second round
Friday, June 16, 2017

Four players finished atop the leadership after the second round for the first time since 1974. Paul Casey was four-over on his round before recording five straight birdies from holes 17-3 to shoot 71 (−1). Brooks Koepka made four birdies on his front-nine to get to nine-under but fell back with two bogeys on the back-nine. They were joined at the top of the leaderboard by Tommy Fleetwood and Brian Harman, who each shot 70 (−2). First round leader Rickie Fowler also got as low as nine-under before three straight bogeys saw him fall a shot behind the leaders. Hideki Matsuyama and Chez Reavie had the low round of the day with a 65 (−7); combined with Fowler's opening round, it is the first time in U.S. Open history that three players shot a round of 65 in the same tournament. Forty-two players were under-par after 36 holes, a new tournament record. The scoring average was 73.225 (+1.225).

For the first time since the introduction of the Official World Golf Ranking in 1986, the top three ranked players (Dustin Johnson, Rory McIlroy, and Jason Day) all missed the cut in a major championship.

Amateurs: Champ (−5), Scheffler (−1), Andersen (+2), McNealy (+3), Smalley (+3), Gregory (+4), Niemann (+5), Crawford (+6), Dalke (+6), Hagestad (+8), Theegala (+8), Harvey (+10), Oda (+10), Lee (+20)

Third round
Saturday, June 17, 2017

Overnight rains and calm conditions during the day led to numerous low scores. Brian Harman birdied three holes on the back-nine to post a score of 67 (−5) and take a one-shot lead over Tommy Fleetwood, Brooks Koepka, and Justin Thomas. Thomas began the round in a tie for 24th before a historic round put him into contention. An eagle on the 18th gave Thomas a score of 63 (−9), tying the major championship record. At nine-under, he set the U.S. Open record for lowest score in relation to par, breaking the mark set by Johnny Miller in 1973. Fleetwood held possession of the lead before a bogey at the par-5 18th saw him finish a shot behind Harman, while Koepka birdied the last to also get to within a stroke. Rickie Fowler recovered from a bogey at the 13th with three straight birdies on holes 14-16 and was two back. Paul Casey began the round tied for the lead but shot a three-over 75 and dropped to 17th.

Five golfers were at 10-under-par or better entering the final round. Before this year, only six golfers had ever reached double digits under par at any point in a U.S. Open. The scoring average was 72.036 (+0.036).

Amateurs: Champ (−4), Scheffler (−2)

Justin Thomas scorecard

{|class="wikitable" span = 50 style="font-size:85%;
|-
|  style="background:Red; width:10px;"|
|Eagle
|  style="background:Pink; width:10px;"|
|Birdie
|  style="background:PaleGreen; width:10px;"|
|Bogey
|}

Final round
Sunday, June 18, 2017

Summary
Brooks Koepka tied the U.S. Open scoring record and won his first career major championship by four strokes over Brian Harman and Hideki Matsuyama. Beginning the round a shot out of the lead, Koepka quickly erased the deficit with birdies on his first two holes. After saving par with an eight-foot putt on the 13th, he then recorded three straight birdies on his way to a round of 67 (−5). His total of 16-under par tied the tournament scoring record set by Rory McIlroy in 2011. Harman entered the round with the lead but fell into a tie for second with three bogeys on the back-nine. Matsuyama shot the low round of the day with 66 (−6) and jumped into a tie with Harman. After establishing a new tournament scoring record in the third round, Justin Thomas bogeyed three of his first five holes and finished three-over on the round to drop to a tie for ninth. Tommy Fleetwood also began the round a shot behind but three bogeys on the front-nine dropped him from contention. The low amateur was Scottie Scheffler, who finished at –1, beating Cameron Champ by just one stroke. In all, thirty-one players finished the tournament under par, breaking the U.S. Open record set in 1990.

Final leaderboard

Scorecard
Final round

Cumulative tournament scores, relative to par
{|class="wikitable" span = 50 style="font-size:85%;
|-
|style="background: Pink;" width=10|
|Birdie
|style="background: PaleGreen;" width=10|
|Bogey
|}

References

External links
 
 United States Golf Association
 Coverage on the PGA Tour's official site
 Coverage on the European Tour's official site
 Coverage on the PGA of America's official site

U.S. Open (golf)
Golf in Wisconsin
Sports competitions in Wisconsin
U.S. Open
U.S. Open (golf)
U.S. Open (golf)
U.S. Open (golf)